Datin Marianne Elisabeth Lloyd-Dolbey (18 October 1919, in Drešinja Vas, Kingdom of Yugoslavia – 10 October 1994, in Celje, Slovenia) was a personal secretary to Sultan of Brunei Omar Ali Saifuddien III.

Early life and education 

Marianne was born in 1919 as Marjana Elizabeta Kopše, to father Franc and mother Marjana (born Vrabič) in Drešinja Vas, Kingdom of Yugoslavia (now Slovenia). Marjana was the firstborn in a family of eleven children.Her birth house still stands at the old main road between Drešinja Vas and Levec. After finishing primary school in Petrovče she enrolled at the Celje First Grammar School where she obtained her secondary school certificate in 1938. In the spring and summer of 1939, she learned Italian in Rome, Italy, and English in the spring of 1941 in Dresden,Saxony, Nazi Germany.

Career 

During World War II, she worked as a translator at the German Embassy in Zagreb, Independent State of Croatia.

At the end of World War II, she retreated to Carinthia in Austria which became part of the British occupation zone of Austria. While working as a translator for the British troops in Austria she met her future husband, the English officer Raoul Teesdale Lloyd-Dolbey. They married in London in 1949, and moved to Brunei where her husband had inherited rubber plantations. Brunei was at that time a British Protectorate located on the northern side of the island of Borneo.

As was one of the few educated women in Brunei, she became a lady-in-waiting at the court of Raja Isteri Pengiran Anak Damit and later the personal secretary to the Queen's husband, the 28th Sultan of Brunei Omar Ali Saifuddien III. In this capacity, Lloyd-Dolbey was a close eyewitness to the introduction of the 1959 Constitution, the Brunei revolt in 1962, the voluntary abdication of Omar Ali Saifuddien III in 1967 in favour of his 21-year-old son Hassanal Bolkiah, who became the 29th and current Sultan of Brunei, the state visit of Queen Elizabeth II in Brunei in 1972, and finally the Bruneian declaration of independence from Great Britain on 1 January 1984 as a native monarchy in the Commonwealth of Nations.

Marianne assisted with the organization of receptions, visits, various celebrations, weddings, and travels abroad, in particular to England. Among her protocol assignments was to be present at childbirth in the Sultan's family. When necessary she acted also as a translator, since she was fluent in the Malay language which was spoken at the court, as well as in Brunei Malay, spoken colloquially in everyday life.

As a token of appreciation for her dedicated service to the Sultan's family, she received a number of Bruneian decorations and the Malay honorific title of a Datin.

Later years 

In the 1980s, Marianne  retired and moved with her husband back to Europe. She spent the summers with her husband mostly in Drešinja Vas, at her parents’ estate where the former building for drying of hops was adapted for living.

Marianne died in 1994 in Celje. She is buried along with her husband Raoul, who died a few years before in Ljubljana, in the Kopše family grave at the cemetery in Žalec, Slovenia.

Recipient of Bruneian decorations 

  Order of Loyalty to the State of Brunei (Darjah Setia Negara Brunei Yang Amat Bahagia): 1st Class (Datin Seri Setia – P.S.N.B. – 1976) and 2nd Class (Datin Setia – D.S.N.B.)

  Order of Merit of Brunei (Darjah Paduka Sri Laila Jasa Yang Amat Berjasa): 1st Class (Datin Paduka Seri Laila Jasa - P.S.L.J.) and 2nd Class (Datin Seri Laila Jasa – D.S.L.J. – 1967)

  Order of the Crown of Brunei (Darjah Seri Paduka Mahkota Brunei Yang Amat Mulia): 1st Class (Datin Seri Paduka – S.P.M.B. – 1970) and 3rd Class (Companion – S.M.B. – 1964)
\
 Sultan Omar Ali Saifuddin Medal: (Pingat Omar Ali Saifuddin – P.O.A.S. – 1960)

References 

1919 births
1994 deaths
People from Celje
Slovenian translators
20th-century translators
Yugoslav emigrants to the United Kingdom
British expatriates in Brunei